Pittosporum patulum is a plant species endemic to New Zealand where it has a restricted distribution in the South Island - ranging from Nelson in the north with occurrences in inland Marlborough down to Wanaka in the south. It is unusual amongst the genus in having deep red and scented flowers.

It is a small tree restricted to sub-alpine sites in canopy gaps in Nothofagus forest and in scree. It is uncommon and may be threatened by grazing and by alien herbivores.

It is listed in the IUCN Red List as Endangered, and on the New Zealand Threat Classification System as Nationally Endangered. In 1999 a recovery plan was approved by the Director-General of the Department of Conservation.

It is occasionally cultivated.

References

Further reading

External links
Pittosporum patulum at the Department of Conservation

Endemic flora of New Zealand
patulum
Endangered flora of New Zealand
Taxonomy articles created by Polbot